Nangai Dam is an earthfill dam located in Akita Prefecture in Japan. The dam is used for flood control and irrigation. The catchment area of the dam is 10 km2. The dam impounds about 44  ha of land when full and can store 1724 thousand cubic meters of water. The construction of the dam was completed in 1978.

References

Dams in Akita Prefecture
1978 establishments in Japan